Moudon was a district in the canton of Vaud, Switzerland. The seat of the district was the town of Moudon.

The district consisted of 32 municipalities and had an area of 119.61 km² with a population of 12273 inhabitants (End of 2003).

Mergers and name changes
 On 1 January 1961 the municipality of Bercher went to the Echallens District.
 On 1 September 2006 the municipalities of Boulens, Chapelle-sur-Moudon, Correvon, Denezy, Martherenges, Montaubion-Chardonney, Neyruz-sur-Moudon, Ogens, Peyres-Possens, Saint-Cierges, Sottens, Thierrens, and Villars-Mendraz came from the District de Moudon to join the Gros-de-Vaud District.
 On 1 September 2006 the municipalities of Brenles, Bussy-sur-Moudon, Chavannes-sur-Moudon, Chesalles-sur-Moudon, Cremin, Curtilles, Dompierre, Forel-sur-Lucens, Hermenches, Lovatens, Lucens, Moudon, Oulens-sur-Lucens, Prévonloup, Rossenge, Sarzens, Syens, Villars-le-Comte, and Vucherens came from the District de Moudon to join the Broye-Vully District.

Municipalities

References

Former districts of the canton of Vaud